Podistra is a genus of beetles belonging to the family Cantharidae.

The species of this genus are found in Europe.

Species:
 Podistra belousovi Kazantsev, 2010 
 Podistra birnbacheri Krauss, 1894

References

Cantharidae
Beetle genera